Joynal Abedin (also known as V.P. Joynal) is a Bangladesh Nationalist Party politician and former Jatiya Sangsad member from the Feni-2 constituency. He is currently advisor to the Chairperson of BNP. He was elected in 1988, 2001, and 2008.

References

External links

Living people
Bangladesh Nationalist Party politicians
4th Jatiya Sangsad members
8th Jatiya Sangsad members
9th Jatiya Sangsad members
Year of birth missing (living people)
Place of birth missing (living people)